Martyn John Evans (born 27 November 1953 in Birmingham, England), is a former South Australian Australian independent and Australian Labor Party state and federal politician.

Evans was educated at The University of Adelaide, and was a State Government Administrative Officer before entering politics. Evans was a member of the City of Elizabeth council from 1975–84 and served as Mayor from 1981–84.

Evans entered the South Australian House of Assembly following the 1984 Elizabeth by-election, caused when Peter Duncan resigned from the seat to contest the federal seat of Makin. Elected as a Labor independent, he served as Minister of Health, Family and Community Services and Minister for the Aged from 1992–93, and rejoined Labor from 1993.

Evans moved from state to federal politics in 1994. He was Australian Labor Party member of the Australian House of Representatives from March 1994 to October 2004, representing the Division of Bonython, South Australia.  A 1994 Elizabeth by-election was sparked when Evans resigned to contest the 1994 Bonython by-election. Evans was a member of the Opposition Shadow Ministry from 1996 to 2001.

The Division of Bonython was abolished at the 2003 electoral redistribution. Evans contested the Division of Wakefield at the 2004 election, which had absorbed most of Bonython's former territory and had become notionally Labor as a result. However, he was narrowly defeated by less than one percent.

Evans took up the position of Director, Community Engagement at The University of Adelaide in July 2007.

References

External links

 

1953 births
Living people
Australian Labor Party members of the Parliament of Australia
Labor Right politicians
Members of the Australian House of Representatives
Members of the Australian House of Representatives for Bonython
People from Birmingham, West Midlands
English people of Welsh descent
Australian people of Welsh descent
University of Adelaide alumni
Mayors of places in South Australia
Australian Labor Party members of the Parliament of South Australia
Independent members of the Parliament of South Australia
21st-century Australian politicians
20th-century Australian politicians